Noble Furnace is an unincorporated community in Wythe County, Virginia, United States. Noble Furnace is the location of a former iron furnace of the same name (also called the Irondale Furnace) constructed in 1880 or 1881. The cold blast furnace was steam powered and its stack was constructed of stone. The furnace was owned by the Norma Iron Company and utilized primarily limestone ore which was transported from nearby deposits to the furnace via tramway.

References

Bibliography

Unincorporated communities in Wythe County, Virginia
Unincorporated communities in Virginia